Chunming Qiao is a Distinguished Professor and Computer Science and Engineering Department chairman at University at Buffalo, and an Elected Fellow of the IEEE.

Education 
Qiao earned his undergrad degree from University of Science and Technology of China.
In 1983, Qiao earned a PhD in Computer Science from University of Pittsburgh.

Career 
In 1997, Qiao is the pioneer of Optical Burst Switching (OBS). 
In 2016, University at Buffalo and its partners received a $1.2 million grant from National Science Foundation to create a research facility to study self-driving cars. The research platform is known as iCAVE2. The project is led by Qiao.

As of 2018, Qiao has seven patents.

Qiao is the Department Chairman of the Computer Science and Engineering Department at University at Buffalo.

References

External links 
 

Year of birth missing (living people)
Living people
Fellow Members of the IEEE
21st-century American engineers
University at Buffalo faculty
University of Science and Technology of China alumni
University of Pittsburgh alumni
American electrical engineers